Munavalli  is a town municipal council in Belagavi district, Karnataka.

Demographics
At the 2001 India census, Manolli had a population of 19897 with 10340 males and 9557 females.

See also

 Belgaum
 Districts of Karnataka

References

External links
 http://Belgaum.nic.in/

Villages in Belagavi district